Infraestruturas de Portugal, S.A. (IP) is a state-owned company which resulted from the merger of Rede Ferroviária Nacional (REFER) and Estradas de Portugal (EP). It manages the Portuguese rail and road infrastructure.

Network

Road

Total length, as of January 2019: 15.253 km

Main roads and motorways:
 Valença International Bridge, (IP1 variante de Valença)
 IC28 (Ponte de Lima-Ponte da Barca)
 VCI/IC23 (Via de Cintura Interna do Porto) with the Arrábida and Freixo bridges and (A20) access
 EN1/IC2 (Porto-Lisboa)
 Variante de Vilar Formoso (IP5)
 IP3 (Coimbra-Viseu)
 IC6 (IP3-Tábua)
 IC12 (Santa Comba Dão-Canas de Senhorim)
 A23 (section Torres Novas-Abrantes)
 IP6 no Alto Alentejo (Fratel-Estremoz)
 IP6 (Peniche-Óbidos)
 IC13 (Portalegre-Alter do Chão)
 Salgueiro Maia Cridge e acessos (IC10)
 Eixo Norte-Sul
 IC16 (Radial da Pontinha)
 CRIL/IC17 (Circular Regional Interna de Lisboa)
 IC19 (Radial de Sintra)
 IC22 (Radial de Odivelas)
 IC1 (section Grândola-Albufeira)
 IC27 (Alcoutim-Castro Marim)
 Guadiana International Bridge

Rail

Total length, as of January 2019: 2.562 km

Lines 

 Linha do Minho
 Ramal de Braga
 Linha de Guimarães
 Linha do Douro
 Linha de Leixões
 Linha do Tua
 Linha do Norte
 Linha do Vouga
 Ramal de Aveiro
 Linha da Beira Alta
 Ramal de Alfarelos
 Linha do Oeste
 Ramal de Tomar
 Ramal da Lousã
 Linha de Vendas Novas
 Linha do Leste
 Linha da Beira Baixa
 Linha de Cintura
 Linha de Sintra
 Linha de Cascais
 Linha do Alentejo
 Linha de Évora
 Linha do Sul
 Linha do Algarve

New lines 
 The  is under construction as of 2023.

Main railway stations 
 Aveiro
 Barreiro
 Beja
 Braga
 Cais do Sodré
 Cascais
 Coimbra-B
 Coimbra
 Évora
 Faro
 Figueira da Foz
 Guarda
 Guimarães
 Lagos
 Lisboa-Oriente
 Lisboa-Santa Apolónia
 Lisboa-Rossio
 Lisboa-Entrecampos
 Pocinho
 Porto-São Bento
 Porto-Campanhã
 Régua
 Setúbal
 Viana do Castelo
 Vila Real de Santo António

Border stations 
 Valença
 Vilar Formoso
 Elvas

Junction stations 
 Nine
 Lousado
 Ermesinde
 Pampilhosa
 Alfarelos
 Bifurcação de Lares
 Lamarosa
 Entroncamento
 Abrantes
 Mira Sintra-Meleças
 Alcântara-Terra
 Pinhal Novo
 Casa Branca
 Tunes

Metre-gauge stations 
 Mirandela
 Espinho-Vouga
 Sernada do Vouga
 Águeda

References

Transport companies of Portugal
Transport companies established in 2015
Portuguese companies established in 2015
Railway infrastructure managers